¡Spiritual, Spiritual! is the fourth album by B-Tribe, released in 2001. According to the sleeve notes, "We believe there is a peace that lives within us all. It is a place of vision and clarity, where the rhythm of life moves in harmony with a higher consciousness".

Track listing

References

2001 albums
B-Tribe albums
Spanish-language albums